Ewa Kasprzyk (born 1 January 1957 in Stargard, Poland) is a Polish actress.

References

External links
 

1957 births
Living people
People from Stargard
Polish actresses